Kaidu (b. 1025 – d. 1100;;) was a Mongol ruler of the Borjigin Clan who was the great-great-grandson of Bodonchar Munkhag (c. 850 – 900). Kaidu's great-grandson was Khabul Khan (died 1149), and Khabul Khan's great-grandson was Genghis Khan (1162–1227), and Kaidu's other great-grandson Khadjuli (died 12th-Century), and Khadjuli Barlas great-great-great-great-great-great-grandson Timur Barlas (1330s–1405), his son Bashinkhor Dogshin succeeded him.
11th-century Mongol rulers
Tengrist monarchs
1025 births

Life
Kaidu is mentioned in the Secret History of the Mongols, the History of Yuan shi, and the Jami al-Tawarikh. He was born circa. 1025 as the youngest of the eight sons of Queen Monolun, the widowed wife of Khachi Khulug, son of Menen Dutum. At this time the Liao Dynasty (907-1125) of the Mongolic Khitan had control over Mongolia, although the northernmost regions were difficult to keep under control. In the 1050s, the Khitans of the Liao Dynasty attacked the Jalair, a Darligin Mongol tribe living at the Kerulen River in the far-eastern region of Mongolia. The Jalair fled to the Borjigin Mongols led by Queen Monolun (Nomulun in the Secret History), the mother of Khaidu. They killed Monolun and all her sons except Kaidu who was hidden by his uncle Nachin. Khaidu later conquered the Jalair and made them his subjects.

Rashid Al-Din says in the Jami Al-Tawarikh:

References

Further reading

 Groisset, René. "The empire of steppes"

11th-century Mongolian people
Borjigin
1020s births
1100 deaths
Year of birth uncertain